Bloodlands (full title Bloodlands: Europe Between Hitler and Stalin is a 2010 book by Yale historian Timothy D. Snyder.

Bloodlands or Blood Lands may also refer to:
Bloodlands (film), a 2017 Albanian horror film
Bloodlands (TV series), a 2021 British television drama series
The Blood Lands, another title for  White Settlers, a 2014 British horror film about a London couple who move to Scotland

See also
Bloodland, Missouri, a former community on the site of Fort Leonart Wood, a US military training installation 
Bloodland Lake virus, a virus found in voles